Sarah Rose Etter is an American author of experimental fiction. Her first novel, The Book of X (2019), won the 2019 Shirley Jackson Novel Award.

The Book of X was also a finalist for the 2019 Believer Book Award, a finalist for the 2019 Golden Poppy Book Award, and long-listed for the 2019 VCU Cabell First Novelist Award.

Her fiction has appeared in Guernica, Gulf Coast, The Los Angeles Review of Books, Juked, and more. Her essays and interviews have appeared in TIME Magazine, VICE, The Cut, BOMB, Electric Literature, and more. She currently lives in Los Angeles, California.

Career 
Etter received her B.A. in English from Pennsylvania State University, and received her M.F.A. in Fiction from Rosemont College.

Her short story collection Tongue Party was selected by writer and judge Deb Olin Unferth as the winner of the 2010 Caketrain Chapbook Competition. Tongue Party was later translated into French (as Hommes sous verre) by Véronique Béghain and published by éditions do. A review in [PANK] praised the collection, stating that "[Etter] takes you into this disturbing world with her phrasing; she takes you to a place that is a rabbit hole, a witching well, an unframed mirror." LitStack's review praised the book as well, stating that "Sarah Rose Etter uses all of the tools and talents at her disposal — her memory, her body, her touch — to pack her small stories with meaning and emotion. The stories are dark, twisted, beautiful and always poetic."

A 2015 profile in The Toast hailed Etter's approach to prose, writing that "Etter’s words don’t settle. This is dangerous ground, a subduction zone. Her stories should come with an earthquake warning."

Etter's first novel, The Book of X, was published by Two Dollar Radio in 2019. It tells the story of the life of a young woman born with a literal knot in her stomach, making her way through a surreal landscape. The book review aggregation site BookMarks cites the novel as having had a "Positive" reception. Kirkus Reviews dubbed The Book of X "relentlessly original look at what it means to exist in a female body." The Minneapolis Star Tribune'''s review of the novel noted that "Etter writes her weird world with elastic prose, as stripped-down at certain points as it is lyrical in others." Cleveland Review of Books said it "blurs the lines between the real and the surreal, forcing readers to confront the sense of danger the uncanny evokes."

Etter has also written extensively about visual art, and a quote from Carol Rama serves as the epigraph for The Book of X. Etter delivered a keynote address at the 2017 Society for the Study of American Women Writers conference, held at the Université Bordeaux Montaigne. The title of her address was "Bizarre Feminism: Surrealism In The Service of a Movement."

 Works 

 Tongue Party, Caketrain, 2011
 The Book of X'', Two Dollar Radio, 2019

References

External links 

 Author's website

Year of birth missing (living people)
Living people
American women novelists
21st-century American women